The 1953–54 Hellenic Football League season was the first in the history of the Hellenic Football League, a football competition in England.

Clubs

League table

References

External links
 Hellenic Football League

1953-54
H